Sándor Kacskó (born 14 January 1960) is a Hungarian sports shooter. He competed in the men's 25 metre rapid fire pistol event at the 1992 Summer Olympics.

References

External links
 

1960 births
Living people
Hungarian male sport shooters
Olympic shooters of Hungary
Shooters at the 1992 Summer Olympics
People from Jászberény
Sportspeople from Jász-Nagykun-Szolnok County